Ronald George Mailer (18 May 1932 – 29 March 2018) was a Scottish footballer, who played for Dunfermline Athletic and Darlington. Mailer was captain of the Dunfermline team that won the 1961 Scottish Cup Final, after a replay, against Celtic. He died on 28 March 2018, aged 85.

References

Sources
 

1932 births
2018 deaths
People from Perth and Kinross
Association football wing halves
Scottish footballers
Dunfermline Athletic F.C. players
Darlington F.C. players
Scottish Football League players
English Football League players
Place of death missing